John Joseph of the Cross (15 August 1654 – 5 March 1739) (not to be confused with John of the Cross) - born Carlo Gaetano Calosinto - was an Italian priest and a professed member from the Order of Friars Minor who hailed from the island of Ischia. He had a reputation for austerity and for the gift of miracles and was appointed Master of Novices.

He was beatified in 1789 and later canonized in 1839.

Life
Carlo Gaetano Calosirto was born on 15 August 1654 on the island of Ischia off the coast of Naples.

He entered the Order of Friars Minor in Naples before he turned sixteen and assumed the religious name of "John Joseph of the Cross". He was the first Italian to follow the reform movement of Peter of Alcantara. In 1674 he was sent to found a convent for the order at Afila in Piedmont and assisted in the actual construction itself. He was ordained to the priesthood - much against his will it should be noted -  and as the superior performed the lowliest tasks.

In 1702 the Italian convents were no longer dependent on the Spanish houses but were formed into a separate province. He was appointed as the Vicar Provincial of the Alcantarine Reform in the Italian peninsula as a result of this. As the superior he ordered that no beggar should be dismissed from the convent gate without some form of relief: in times of need he devoted to their necessities his own portions and even that of the convent he lived at. When he trekked across the mainland as the provincial he would not make himself known at the inns where he lodged because he disliked distinction and did not believe such should be paid to him.

He desired those whom he restored to health to take some certain medicine that the cure might be attributed to a mere natural source and with regard to his own prophecies - which were numerous - he affected to judge from analogies and experiences.

Sainthood
He was beatified under Pope Pius VI on 24 May 1789 and was later canonized as a saint of the Roman Catholic Church on 26 May 1839 under Pope Gregory XVI. At the Aragonese Castle (Il Castello Aragonese) on Ischia there is a small chapel consecrated to the late friar.

References

External links
 Santi e Beati
 The Franciscan Book of Saints, ed. by Marion Habig, OFM
 Lives of the Saints for Every Day of the Year, edited by Rev. Hugo Hoever, S.O. Cist., Ph.D.

1654 births
1739 deaths
Italian Roman Catholic saints
Italian Friars Minor
18th-century Christian saints
Beatifications by Pope Pius VI
Venerated Catholics
Canonizations by Pope Gregory XVI
Franciscan saints